Henryk Gajdzik (born 12 February 1925) was a Polish footballer. He played in ten matches for the Poland national football team from 1947 to 1948.

References

External links
 

1925 births
Possibly living people
Polish footballers
Poland international footballers
Place of birth missing (living people)
Association footballers not categorized by position